These are the official results of the Men's 400 metres hurdles event at the 2003 IAAF World Championships in Paris, France. There were a total number of 29 participating athletes, with four qualifying heats, two semi-finals and the final held on Thursday 2003-08-28 at 22:00h.

Final

Semi-final
Held on Monday 2003-08-25

Heats
Held on Sunday 2003-08-25

See also
Athletics at the 2003 Pan American Games - Women's 400 metres hurdles

References
 

H
400 metres hurdles at the World Athletics Championships
2003 in women's athletics